= Michael Gangyu Kong =

Michael Gangyu Kong from the Loughborough University, Loughborough, Leicestershire, UK was named Fellow of the Institute of Electrical and Electronics Engineers (IEEE) in 2012 for contributions to atmospheric pressure glow discharge sources in biology and medicine.
